Majid Entezami (born 9 March 1948) is an Iranian composer, conductor, musician and oboist. He composed music for 9 television series, 10 suite symphonies and over 80 movies. His works include The Cyclist, The Fateful Day, The Glass Agency and The Insane Flew Away, all of which he was awarded the best award for film music for in the International Fajr Film Festival of Tehran. Besides that, his music for The Train, Once Upon A Time, Cinema, From Karkheh To Rhine, Attack on H-3, The Fragrance of Joseph's Shirt, Duel, A Place To Live, Intense Cold, The Saint Mary, The Men of Anjelos, The Wolves and The Loneliest General are some of his most notable, memorable and nostalgic works for Iranians. Majid Entezami is one of the most active film composers after the revolution of Iran.

Early life 
Majid Entezami was born in 1948 in Tehran. He played the oboe at the Tehran Conservatory of Music. After graduation he was forced to travel to Germany for a medical operation and decided to continue his studies at State University of West Berlin under the supervision of Karl Steins and Lothar Koch in 1968. He performed successful concerts with Berlin University Symphony Orchestra in Lyon, Nancy and Marseille, France from 1969 to 1972.

In 1973 Entezami came to Iran by the invitation of Tehran Symphony Orchestra and performed a successful Mozart concert as oboe soloist, conducted by Helge Dorsch. After this concert Journal de Tehran called him one of the most talented young musicians in Iran. Then he returned to Germany as a member of the Berlin Symphony Orchestra and West Deutsche Philharmonie.

In 1974 he became a member of Tehran Symphony Orchestra as well as teacher at the Tehran Conservatory and music department of Tehran University. After his return he has performed two oboe recitals with Lucette Martirossian on piano and harpsichord and Ivan Pristas on bassoon in 1976 and a concert with the  orchestra conducted by Ali Rahbari and Valodia Tarkhanian as viola d’amore soloist.

Becoming a film composer 
Despite being the son of famous Iranian actor Ezzatollah Entezami, Majid's entrance into the cinema industry was his own.

In 1977, due to differences of opinion with the Symphonic Orchestra of Tehran, he resigned from playing in the orchestra and teaching at the university and took other work. At the time, one of his friends who had a position in Kanoon (Institute for the Intellectual Development of Children and Young Adults), Ahmadreza Ahmadi, suggested composing some music for contemporary poetry.

After composing music for the poetry of Foroogh Farrokhzad and Nosrat Rahmani, he found another position composing music for an animation, Zaal and Simorgh by Ali Akbar Sadeghi. Entezami's first cinema work was for Journey of the Stone, directed by Masoud Kimiaei, who was a famous director at that time.

Music Characteristic 
Entezami has a profound understanding of the picture and has always tried to tell the untold essence of the story. He also has experience with a variety of styles which has given his portfolio variety, from comedies like Once Upon a Time, Cinema by Mohsen MakhmalBaf, to the creation of epic war stories.

The music of Entezami is orchestral and based on western classical music, but with Iranian instruments and unusual rhythms which give his works an eastern feel. He creates new atmospheres in his music by using synthesizers, combining sounds from different instruments to create new sounds, or by using a range less common in the instruments that he uses. These sounds, albeit new, are close to the mentality of characters. Using the sound of stones in the film The Fateful Day, by Shahram Assadi, is a good example of this.

Every theme and musical color heard in Entezami's work has a rational explanation in the story. He believes that music tells a part of the story that is not already told in the picture. Some of his works seem to be narrative, almost like part of the script, but he maintains that no director has ever asked him for such characteristics.

In Once Upon a Time, Cinema, parts of the film Lor Girl are played for the Shah and his court. The actress of the main character, Golnar, which the Shah has fallen in love with, comes out of the film and becomes real. Instead of creating new music, Entezami uses the main theme of Lor Girl in all the scenes that she is present, with variations on the theme that indicate this is not the original Lor Girl, but Golnar who has traveled in time and found herself in the Shah's palace. He also gives a brief hint as to what is going to happen next before the Lor Girl scenes by playing the main melody from that film together with a waltz.

In the last scene of the film, a picture of a fetus is shown, which is reminiscent of the movie 2001, A Space Odyssey by Stanley Kubrick. Entezami's music is inspired by Thus Spoke Zarathustra by Richard Strauss, to provide a deeper impression.

In another collaboration with Makhmalbaaf, Entezami shows life in opposition to death, in The Peddler. In the scene where the old woman dies, she draws her last breath as a clock slows. Instead of a requiem for her death, Entezami recreates the sound of the stopped clock with piano, harp, and glockenspiel. A fair girl appears in a carriage and is accompanied by epic music by choir and orchestra.

Discography

References

Iranian composers
1948 births
Living people
Iranian Science and Culture Hall of Fame recipients in Music